USS Goldcrest (AM-80), a steel-hulled commercial trawler built as MV Shawmut in 1928 by the Bethlehem Shipbuilding Corp., Quincy, Massachusetts, was acquired by the United States Navy from the Massachusetts Trawling Co. of Boston, Massachusetts, on 29 November 1940, and converted to a minesweeper. The ship was commissioned as a naval trawler at the Boston Navy Yard on 15 May 1941.

World War II East Coast operations 
Following shakedown training at Mine Warfare School, Yorktown, Virginia, Goldcrest arrived New York on 10 August 1942 to base at Staten Island while serving as an inshore patrol and NROTC cadet school ship under the 3rd Naval District. On 24 August, she became flagship of Division 1 of the Inshore Patrol Force. In Sandy Hook Bay, New Jersey, while on patrol 11 March 1943, she sank by gunfire three mines that had drifted from defensive minefields. On 29 March, she assisted a damaged merchantman off Staten Island.
 
Her patrol and school ship duties continued until 5 August 1945 when she transferred to Charleston, South Carolina, for minesweeping duty.

End-of-War decommissioning 
Goldcrest was decommissioned on 12 December 1945 and was sold on 20 June 1946 to her former owner.

References

External links
 
 Ships of the U.S. Navy, 1940-1945 Minecraft
 DANFS Online: Mine Warfare Vessels

 

Ships built in Quincy, Massachusetts
1938 ships
Goldcrest-class minesweepers
World War II minesweepers of the United States